CNCA may refer to:

 Caisse Nationale de Crédit Agricole, a French banking network
 Carbon Neutral Cities Alliance
 Certification and Accreditation Administration, part of the Standardization Administration of China
 National Anti-Terrorism Coordination Center, now part of the Intelligence Center for Counter-Terrorism and Organized Crime, Spain
 National Council of Culture and the Arts, Chile